Kuretake is a Japanese manufacturing company of writing implements. The firm began its activities manufacturing  ink and brushes and then expanded its range of products, producing mainly pens.

Current range of products manufactured by Kuretake includes markers, brush pens, inks, watercolors.

History 
Founded under the name of "Kuretake Sumi" in 1902, the company originally started by producing  brushes, a brush similar in style to certain watercolor brushes, sharing a generally thick wooden or bamboo handle, and a broad soft hair brush that when wetted form a fine tip.

In 1965, Kuretake Industries Co., Ltd. was established as a plant specializing in the production of writing instruments while Tokyo office was established. In 1986, a subsidiary, "Kuretake U.K. Ltd." was established in the West Midlands, England. In 2014 another subsidiary, "Kuretake ZIG Corporation" was established in Sacramento, United States.

Products 
Kuretake (and its subsidiary brand, "Zig") manufactures a wide variety of markers, such as highlighters and watercolor markers.

The firm also gained reputation for its "brush pen", similar to a marker pen with a brush-shapered flexible tip but refillable, using replaceable ink cartridges like fountain pens do. The brush pen by Kuretake was the first using cartridges (although Pentel would later launch a brush model that used cartridges also).

Through its brand "ScrapBooking", Kuretake produces other stationery items such as papers, templates, corner punches, color selectors, and photo tapes.

References

External links

 

Companies based in Nara Prefecture
Manufacturing companies established in 1902
Japanese brands
Japanese stationery
Art materials brands
Ink brands
Pulp and paper companies of Japan
Design companies established in 1902